Havelock Town is a neighbourhood of Colombo, Sri Lanka, part of an area zoned as Colombo 5. It is located approximately 6 kilometres south of Fort, the central business district of Colombo. Havelock City, a mixed-used development in Havelock Town is to be the largest property development in Sri Lanka incorporating residential and commercial facilities.

It is named after Arthur Havelock who served as the British governor of Ceylon from 1890 to 1895.

Schools 
 Hindu College
 Isipathana College
 Lumbini Vidyalaya
 Royal Institute
 Wesley College, Colombo Primary School 
 Royal Institute International School
 St.Peter's College
 Hindu College
 Ramanathan Hindu Ladies College

Diplomatic missions

 Honorary Consulate of Serbia
 Embassy of Italy
 Embassy of Cuba
 Honorary Consulate General of Sweden
 Honorary Consulate of Ukraine

Places of interest 
 Isipathanaramaya Temple
 Edward Henry Pedris Grounds (Havelock Grounds)
 Edward Henry Pedris Children's Library  
 Edward Henry Pedris Park

References

Populated places in Western Province, Sri Lanka